Marcos Guerrero Tejada (born 16 April 1984 in Arroyo de la Miel, Province of Málaga) is a Spanish footballer who plays as a central defender.

External links

1984 births
Living people
Sportspeople from the Province of Málaga
Spanish footballers
Footballers from Andalusia
Association football defenders
Segunda División players
Segunda División B players
Tercera División players
Atlético Malagueño players
Hércules CF players
CD Torrevieja players
Zamora CF footballers
CD Badajoz players
Marbella FC players